Doctor Smith may refer to:

People
Bob Smith (doctor) (1879–1950), co-founded Alcoholics Anonymous
E. E. Smith (1890–1965), also known as Doc Smith, early science fiction writer

Fictional entities
Dr. Zachary Smith, a fictional character from Lost in Space
Doctor, a fictional character from Doctor Who

See also
Smith (surname)